The 2012 Northern Iowa Panthers football team represented the University of Northern Iowa in the 2012 NCAA Division I FCS football season. The team was coached by Mark Farley and played their home games in the UNI-Dome. They are a member of the Missouri Valley Football Conference. They finished the season 5–6, 4–4 in MVFC play to finish in a tie for sixth place.

Schedule

Game summaries

Personnel

Roster
2012 Roster

Coaching staff

Rankings

References

Northern Iowa
Northern Iowa Panthers football seasons
Northern Iowa Panthers football